Mahesar is a Sindhi tribe of Samma origin in Sindh, Pakistan & some parts of  India. Shah Abdul Latif Bhittai in his poetry has used the word of Mahesar which means Murshid or Kamil and guiding soul.

Mahesar is a Sindhi community cast. Mostly Mahesar community living in Sindh Province, they are also living in other parts of the World like Dubai Sharjah KSA United States England Japan China and other Countries. 
It means clear that Mahesar means Murshid or Kamil.

References

Sindhi tribes